Eupithecia idalia is a moth in the  family Geometridae first described by Paul Dognin in 1890. It is found in Ecuador.

References

Moths described in 1890
idalia
Moths of South America